Nahko and Medicine for the People is an American world music group. The six-member band is headed by frontman Nahko Bear.

Background
Born in Portland, Oregon, of Puerto Rican and Filipino descent, Nahko Bear was adopted at a young age and raised by a white family. It wasn't until his early twenties that he would meet his birth mother. He wrote the song "Early February" shortly before this meeting; it describes a woman far too young to be pregnant putting her baby in the bed of a woman she'd never met. Bear says his creative inspiration is the desire to bridge cultural gaps, and that he has been musically inclined since the age of six, when he started learning to play the piano. Bear has also worked as a piano teacher and music director. In 2012, he began traveling around the United States in a van with his dog.
In 2017, Bear released a solo album titled My Name Is Bear, under the name Nahko.

On July 8, 2020, following accusations from multiple individuals of sexually inappropriate behavior, Bear resigned from the board of Honor the Earth. In their statement, "Regarding Nahko", the Honor the Earth board stated that they have "a zero-tolerance policy for sexual harassment and inappropriate sexual behavior".

Band members
Current
 Nahko Bear – vocals
 Justin Chittams –  drums
 Joe Hall – lead guitar
 Patricio Zuñiga Labarca  – bass guitar
 Max Ribner – trumpet, flugelhorn
 Tim Snider – electric violin
 TJ Schaper – trombone

Past
 Hope Medford – hand percussion and rhythm
 Don Corey – bass (recorded on Dark as Night)
 Chase Makai – lead guitar

Tours and festivals
Nahko and Medicine for the People have toured with  Nattali Rize, Rebelution, Michael Franti, Trevor Hall, Dispatch, Xavier Rudd, and SOJA. The band largely appears at alternative music festivals, including the Greenbelt Festival, the ARISE Music Festival,
and Tour de Fat.

Discography

Nahko and Medicine for the People
Studio albums
 Dark As Night (2013)
 On the Verge (2014)
 HOKA (2016)
 Take Your Power Back (2020)

Singles

Nahko
 My Name Is Bear (2017)

References

Further reading
Reviews

External links
 
 

Musical groups established in the 2000s
American world music groups